Marriage is a 1977 Soviet comedy film directed by Vitaly Melnikov.

Plot 
A friend of the court adviser Podkolesin was able to convince him to get involved with the daughter of the merchant. But before the wedding, the groom escapes.

Cast 
 Svetlana Kryuchkova as Agafia Tikhonovna
 Aleksey Petrenko as Ivan Kuzmich Podkolesin
 Oleg Borisov as Kochkaryov
 Vladislav Strzhelchik as Ivan Pavlovich Yaichnitsa
 Borislav Brondukov as Nikanor Ivanovich Anuchkin
 Yevgeny Leonov as Baltazar Balrazarovich Zhevakin
 Mayya Bulgakova as Arina Panteleimonovna
 Valentina Talyzina as Fyokla Ivanovna
 Tamara Guseva as Dunyashka
 Nikolay Penkov as Stepan

References

External links 
 

1977 films
1970s Russian-language films
Soviet comedy films
1977 comedy films